Władysław Hasior (Polish pronunciation: , May 14, 1928 – July 14, 1999) was one of the leading Polish contemporary sculptors connected with the Podhale region. He was also a painter and theatre set designer.

Biography
Władysław Hasior was born in Nowy Sącz on May 14, 1928. From 1947-1952, he studied under Professor Antoni Kenar at the State Secondary School of Visual Art Techniques in Zakopane. In 1952 he started his studies in sculpture at the Academy of Fine Arts in Warsaw. He graduated from the Academy in 1958. From 1959-60, he stayed in Paris as a holder of a scholarship of the French Ministry Culture and studied under Ossip Zadkine. His first individual exhibition was in 1961 at the Jewish Theater in Warsaw. Since then his works have been displayed at over seventy individual exhibitions in Poland and Europe.  In 1968 Hasior had returned to his first school and became a teacher there until 1968.

Hasior’s art meant to provoke and shock the beholder. He continuously experimented with forms, techniques and materials by creating spatial compositions, assemblages and collages. He also authored many unconventional monuments and plein air sculptures, both in Poland and abroad. Since 1984 artist focused on the continuous arrangement of the authors Gallery.

Władysław Hasior died on July 14, 1999 in Kraków. He is buried at the Zakopane Cemetery of the Meritorious at Pęksowy Brzyzek.

Hasior Museum in Zakopane
Gallery devoted to Hasior's work has existed since 1984 and is situated in the interior of the ‘deck-chair rental’ by the ‘Warszawianka’ Hotel, a building that was built prior to World War II when Zakopane was an antituberculosis resort and bed rest in the open air was a common form of treatment.

Officially, Hasior’s Gallery is a branch of the Tatra Museum, which the artist enriched with a "dowry" of around one hundred of his works. They constituted the bases for the permanent exhibition made available to the visitors on the ground floor of the building. This is the exhibition which the host of gallery continuously developed and altered, building some kind of a total work, a unique installation of his own exhibits, he created a magical space imbued with music, light, and turned unreal with reflection of huge mirrors.

Education
 1947–1952, High school of Art Techniques in Zakopane
 1952–1958, Academy of Fine Arts in Warsaw

Works
 Niobe (1961)
 series of  Banners (1965–1975)
 Golgota (1971)
 Dark landscape (1974)
 Embroidery of Character (1974)
 Interrogation of Angel (1980)

Monuments
 For the rescuers in Zakopane(1959)
 Organ on Snozka pass near Czorsztyn (1966)
 Monument to the executed hostages from Nowy Sącz in Wroclaw (1966)
 Burned Pieta near Copenhagen (1972)
 Fire Birds” in Szczecin (1975)
 Fire Birds” in Koszalin (1977)

See also
Culture of Poland
Zakopane
Academy of Fine Arts in Warsaw

References

Bibliography
 Anda Rottenberg, Teresa Jabłońska, Marek Pabis, Maciej Buszewicz, Magdalena Iwińska, Władysław Hasior, Olszanica 2004, publisher Bosz, .

1928 births
1999 deaths
Modern sculptors
20th-century Polish painters
20th-century Polish male artists
Academy of Fine Arts in Warsaw alumni
20th-century Polish sculptors
Polish male sculptors
Polish male painters
Academic staff of the Academy of Fine Arts in Warsaw